Goethals is a Dutch surname originating in Flanders. It seems to be derived from Goedaels, meaning "good ale", and, equivalent to the English and German surnames Goodale and Gutbier, would have referred to a brewer. People with the surname include:

Angela Goethals (born 1977), American actress
Auguste Goethals (1812–1888), Belgian lieutenant general and minister of war
Christian Goethals (1928–2003), Belgian racing driver
Félix Goethals (1891–1962), French road bicycle racer
Félix Victor Goethals (1798–1872), Belgian historian, librarian and genealogist
George Washington Goethals (1858–1928), United States Army officer and civil engineer 
Guy Goethals (born 1952), Belgian football referee
Henry Goethals (c.1217–1293), Flemish scholastic philosopher
Lucien Goethals (1931–2006), Belgian composer
Paul Goethals (1832–1901), Belgian Jesuit priest, first Catholic archbishop of Calcutta.
Pieter Goethals (1826–1860), Flemish victim of judicial error, beheaded for a murder he did not commit
Raymond Goethals (1921–2004), Belgian football coach
Robert Goethals (1922–2011), Belgian football coach
Thomás Goethals (born 1983), Dutch/Mexican DJ

Named after George Washington Goethals
Goethals Bridge in New York City 
Goethals Medal, awarded by the Society of American Military Engineers
USS General G. W. Goethals (ID-1443) and USNS George W. Goethals (T-AP-182), US Navy ships
Dredge Goethals US Army ocean-going hopper dredger
Named after Paul Goethals
Goethals Memorial School, administered by the Congregation of Christian Brothers in India

References

Dutch-language surnames
Surnames of Belgian origin